Memeh Caleb Okoli (born 13 July 2001) is an Italian professional footballer who plays as a centre-back for  club Atalanta.

Club career
Okoli joined the youth teams of Atalanta in the summer of 2015 and started playing for their Under-19 squad in the 2018–19 season. He was occasionally called up to Atalanta's senior team in that season and the next, but never appeared on the field. He also represented the club in the 2019–20 UEFA Youth League.

On 25 September 2020, he joined Serie B club SPAL on loan.

He made his Serie B debut for SPAL on 21 November 2020 in a game against Pescara. He started and played the full game in a 2–0 victory.

On 12 July 2021, he joined Serie B club Cremonese on a season-long loan.

Okoli returned to Atalanta in July 2022, after his loan ended, and was integrated into Atalanta's first team for the following season. He made his Serie A debut with Atalanta on 13 August 2022 in a 2–0 victory over Sampdoria.

International career
Born in Italy, Okoli is of Nigerian descent. He was first called up to represent Italy in 2019 with the Italy U19 side.

He made his debut with the Italy U21 team on 7 September 2021, playing as a starter in the qualifying match won 1–0 against Montenegro.

References

External links
Profile at the Atalanta B.C. website
 

Living people
2001 births
Italian people of Nigerian descent
Sportspeople from Vicenza
Italian sportspeople of African descent
Italian footballers
Footballers from Veneto
Association football defenders
Italy youth international footballers
Serie A players
Serie B players
Atalanta B.C. players
S.P.A.L. players
U.S. Cremonese players